Hugh Bradley may refer to:

Hugh Bradley (Arkansas settler) (1783–1854), early settler of South Arkansas
Hugh Bradley (baseball) (1885–1949), Major League Baseball player